The 1967–68 Roller Hockey Champions Cup was the 3rd edition of the Roller Hockey Champions Cup organized by CERH.

Reus Deportiu achieved their second consecutive title.

Teams
The champions of the main European leagues, and Reus Deportiu as title holders, played this competition, consisting in a double-legged knockout tournament. As Reus Deportiu was also the Spanish league champions, Mataró also joined the tournament.

Bracket

Source:

References

External links
 CERH website

1967 in roller hockey
1968 in roller hockey
Rink Hockey Euroleague